"Drive" is the 149th episode of Star Trek: Voyager, and the third episode of its seventh season. The Voyager crew participates in a space race, but not all is as it seems to be. Meanwhile B'Elanna and Tom Paris work on their relationship.

This science fiction television show episode was written by Michael Taylor and directed by Winrich Kolbe.

This episode includes scenes with the fictional spacecraft, the Delta Flyer.

Casting 
Guest acting roles, in addition to the main Star Trek: Voyager cast include:

 Cyia Batten as Irina
 Brian George as O'zzal
 Patrick Kilpatrick as Assam
 Robert Tyler as Joxom
 Chris Covics as an assistant
 Majel Barret as computer voice

Plot
Tom Paris and Harry Kim are out taking the new Delta Flyer, rebuilt after the destruction of the first, for a spin through an asteroid field when they are challenged to a drag race by a pilot named Irina in another craft. As they race they detect a gas leak on board her shuttle. They beam her to safety and bring her craft back to Voyager for repairs.

Irina tells them that she's training with her craft for an important race. Interested, Paris and Kim persuade Captain Janeway to let them enter the Delta Flyer into the race. Janeway agrees because the race is a milestone of peace between four warring cultures who have finally come together to end their strife.

B'Elanna Torres is disappointed that Paris will be racing; she had put serious effort into planning some time off for the two to spend together, and in his excitement over the race, Tom forgets about their plans. He apologizes to her and she claims it is no problem but is inwardly depressed. She even begins to have doubts about their relationship. She confides in Neelix, who convinces her to be patient with Tom, since she really does love him. Seven of Nine suggests that B'Elanna take up some of Tom's hobbies and interests so that they might spend more time together. That thought gives B'Elanna an idea.

On the day of the race Tom is surprised to find that B'Elanna has taken Harry's place as his co-pilot. She promises to do her best to help the Flyer to victory. As the race nears its end something goes wrong in one of the other shuttles. It's Irina's ship. Her co-pilot has been injured in a console explosion when their shield generators overloaded in an act of sabotage. The rest of the race is cancelled for the day and as Harry helps Irina with her shuttle, she invites him to be her new co-pilot.

Seeing romance sparking between Harry and Irina, B'Elanna has more feelings of doubt about Tom's dedication to their relationship. As the race starts up again, she tries to put her pensive feelings aside and concentrate on winning, but she is not able to hide her distress. She and Tom begin to argue and he insists she tell him what is wrong. Frustrated, he stops the Flyer right in the middle of the race and declares they will not move until they resolve their problem.

At the same time, Harry discovers more damage on board Irina's ship, and that she caused it herself. She pulls a weapon on him but he gets it away from her and holds her safely at bay. Irina is bent on sabotaging the peace agreement between the four cultures involved in the race, and she has turned her own ship into a terrorist bomb. To make things worse, she has planted a bomb on board the Delta Flyer as well. Still holding her at phaserpoint, Harry sends Tom a message to inform him of the danger.

Tom and B'Elanna receive the message just as he makes his devotion to her a bit clearer by proposing marriage. They speed the Flyer into a nearby nebula and eject the sabotaged warp core where it explodes a safe distance from the racers and spectators. Irina is taken into custody.

The next mission of the Delta Flyer is shown to be Tom and B'Elanna's honeymoon.

Reception 
In 2001, Digital Spy noted that this episode focuses on the relationship between Tom and B'Elanna, and also involves a race in space.

In 2017, Comic Book Resources ranked Tom and B'Elanna the sixth best romantic relationship of the Star Trek franchise.

In 2021, SyFy said this was Tom Paris-centric episode, and praised it for exploring the rockier side of relationships as it delves into the Tom-B'Elanna romance.

Home media releases 
On December 21, 2003, this episode was released on DVD as part of a Season 7 boxset; Star Trek Voyager: Complete Seventh Season.

References

External links
 

Star Trek: Voyager (season 7) episodes
2000 American television episodes
Television episodes about weddings